Lachner is a German surname. Notable people with the surname include:

Ernest A. Lachner (1915–1996), American ichthyologist
Franz Lachner (1803–1890), German composer
Ignaz Lachner (1807–1895), German conductor, composer
Ludwig Lachner (1910–2003), German footballer
Roberto Garcia Lachner (born 1977), Costa Rican triathlete
Vinzenz Lachner (1811–1893), German conductor, composer

See also
 Lackner (surname)

German-language surnames